Dark Summer is a 1992 novel from Australian author Jon Cleary. It was the ninth book featuring Sydney homicide detective Scobie Malone, and begins with the discovery of a corpse in Scobie's swimming pool. The dead man was an informer involved in Scobie's recent drug investigation. Scobie puts his family under police protection and tracks down the killer.

Like many of Cleary's novels it features sport, in this case one day cricket.

In 1997 Peter Yeldham adapted the novel for a proposed telemovie, but this was never made.

References

External links
Dark Summer at AustLit (subscription required)

1992 Australian novels
Novels set in Sydney
HarperCollins books
William Morrow and Company books
Novels by Jon Cleary